Garth Philip Davis (born January 28, 1970) is an American bariatric surgeon, physician and author. Davis specializes in weight management and is 
known for his advocacy of plant-based nutrition.

Biography

Davis was born in South Africa and moved to the United States as a child. He graduated Phi Beta Kappa from the University of Texas at Austin and from Baylor College of Medicine with high honors. Davis completed his surgical residency at the University of Michigan where he was elected to the position of Chief Administrative Resident.

Davis was the medical director of the Davis Clinic in Houston, Texas, and was the medical director for bariatric surgery at the Memorial Hermann Memorial City Hospital. He went on to be the medical director of the weight management center at Mission Hospital in Asheville, North Carolina.

Davis is a board-certified surgeon who specializes in bariatric surgery and Medical Weight Loss at Mission Weight Management Center in Asheville, North Carolina.He is now back in Houston, Texas, working for Houston Methodist and Methodist West, and is serving as the medical director for the Comprehensive Metabolic Disease Management Center.

Davis is certified by the American Board of Surgery and is a fellow of the American College of Surgeons and the American Society for Metabolic and Bariatric Surgery and the American Board of Obesity Medicine.

In 2007, Davis and his father Robert Davis were featured on the reality television show Big Medicine which contained footage from their bariatric surgery practice. 

Davis is a vegan in his personal life and supports animal rights.

In Media

Davis has gained media recognition for helping several people, including a celebrity, lose hundreds of pounds by using bariatric surgery in combination with lifestyle changes. One person became a triathlete.

Davis has partnered with Memorial Hermann Memorial City Medical Center and Rawfully Organic Co-Op to open Houston’s first hospital-based organic produce stand. They have launched a "Farmacy" program with specialized prescription pads for this purpose. Patients are prescribed fruits and vegetables.

Scam

A picture of Garth Davis has been used in a tag team money transfer scam, including forged documents and multiple scammers impersonating authorities. One victim involved (Chen) lost her entire life savings, and some of her husband's superannuation, totalling $571,000. In this instance, the scammer pretending to be Garth Davis, under the alias "Frank Harrison", began forming a relationship with Chen several month prior. Telling of plans to move to her country (Australia), to set up a business. The scammer also shared interest in meeting in person. After several months, the scammer called and asked for help in paying a penalty due to carrying $1.5 million through customs. Soon, a woman impersonating a Malaysian customs officer contacted Chen, and said that the $1.5 million would be released upon payment of a $3,000 penalty fee. Chen gave in. The scammers concocted a litany of excuses, such as security fees, stamp duty, demurrage, legal costs, refund fees, GST and stringed Chen along for six months, convincing her to make a total of 33 payments, from $5000 to $30,000 in value. When made aware, Garth Davis has made a Facebook post warning of fake Instagram accounts that have been using his image, as well as stating "I am not on any dating sites. And I do not need you to send me money. Lots of people stealing pics and making fake accounts." The scammers are thought to be from Africa.

Proteinaholic

Davis is best known for his book Proteinaholic: How Our Obsession with Meat Is Killing Us and What We Can Do About It, which argues that a high-protein diet of animal source foods causes people to be overweight and more susceptible to certain diseases, such as cancer and diabetes. Davis states that people can get all the protein they need from a plant-based diet. Davis has written that there is "a broad consensus that including plants and limiting animals in our diets is the single best thing we can do for our health".

Selected publications

Journal publications

Chang VC, Pan P, Shah SK, Srinivasan A, Haberl E, Wan C, Kajese TM, Primomo JA, Davis G. "Routine preoperative endoscopy in patients undergoing bariatric surgery." Surg Obes Relat Dis. 2020 Jun;16(6):745-750.
Primomo JA, Kajese T, Davis G, Davis R, Shah S, Orsak M, Morrison C. "Decreased access to bariatric care: an analysis of referral practices to bariatric specialists. " Surg Obes Relat Dis. 2016 Nov;12(9):1725-1730.
Davis R, Davis GP. "Ensuring safe passage of the OrVil anvil utilizing a corkscrew maneuver." Surg Obes Relat Dis. 2013 Mar-Apr;9(2):329-30.
Scheffer C, Blanckenberg M, Garth-Davis B, Eisenberg M. "Biomedical engineering education through global engineering teams." Annu Int Conf IEEE Eng Med Biol Soc. 2012;2012:5058-61.
Davis G, Patel JA, Gagne DJ. "Pulmonary considerations in obesity and the bariatric surgical patient." Med Clin North Am. 2007 May;91(3):433-42

Books
The Expert’s Guide to Weight-Loss Surgery (Penguin Random House, 2010)
Proteinaholic: How Our Obsession With Meat Is Killing Us and What We Can Do About It (HarperCollins, 2016)

See also
 List of animal rights advocates
 List of vegans

References

1970 births
21st-century American physicians
American health and wellness writers
American medical writers
American nutritionists
American surgeons
American veganism activists
Anti-obesity activists
Baylor College of Medicine alumni
Fellows of the American College of Surgeons
Living people
Obesity researchers
People from Johannesburg
Plant-based diet advocates
University of Texas at Austin alumni